Algirdas Pocius (28 August 1930 – 14 August 2021) was a Lithuanian politician and writer.

Biography
In 1954, he began working as a radio correspondent in Šiauliai. That year, he joined the Lithuanian Writers' Union. He was Vice-President of the Union from 1981 to 1986.

In 1960, Pocius joined the Communist Party of the Soviet Union. In 1990, he joined the Democratic Labour Party of Lithuania (LDDP) and served in the Seimas from 1992 to 1996.

Algirdas Pocius died on 14 August 2021 at the age of 90.

Works
Rytmetis Užgirių kaime (1955)
Žąsies kiaušinis (1959)
Šešiolika raktų (1960)
Verpetas (1963)
Striukis keliauninkas (1964)
Tik du sūnūs (1966)
Randai medyje (1968)
Ištirpę migloje (1972)
Dobilų žydėjimas (1975)
Laiškas ant šalpusnio lapo (1977)
Hommikul, kui vaevas uni (1977)
Per laukus iki miesto (1979)
Išskridę iš lizdo (1980)
Почтальон Теофилис (1981)
Вкус тмина (1981)
Liepos šešėlyje (1984)
Striukis keliauninkas (1984)
Барбоска (1984)
Įkaitai (1987)
Sūpuoklėse (1989)
Užmarštis (1990)
Заложники (1990)
Antros eilės pusbrolis (2000)
Ekskomisaras (2005)
Prie piliakalnio (2006)
Ponia Amnestija (2007)

Awards
 for Tik du sūnūs (1967)
 for Išskridę iš lizdo (1982)
Juozas Paukštelis Prize for Liepos šešėlyje (1985)

References

1930 births
2021 deaths
20th-century Lithuanian politicians
Members of the Seimas
Communist Party of the Soviet Union members
Democratic Labour Party of Lithuania politicians
People from Mažeikiai District Municipality